Pol-e Zal (also Romanized as Pol-e Zāl; also known as Polezāl) is a village in Hoseyniyeh Rural District, Alvar-e Garmsiri District, Andimeshk County, Khuzestan Province, Iran. At the 2006 census, its population was 77, in 14 families. The village is located close to Khorramabad-Pol-e Zal Freeway.

References 

Populated places in Andimeshk County